Hua Xiong (died 191) was a military general serving under the warlord Dong Zhuo during the late Eastern Han dynasty of China.

Life
Little is recorded about Hua Xiong in history, apart from the fact that he served as a military officer under the warlord Dong Zhuo and held the position of Chief Controller (都督). In early 190, when a coalition of warlords from the east of Hangu Pass launched a military campaign in the name of freeing the Han central government from Dong Zhuo's control, Hua Xiong led Dong Zhuo's forces to engage the enemy. He was defeated and killed in a battle at Yangren (陽人; believed to be near present-day Wenquan, Ruzhou, Henan) against Sun Jian.

In Romance of the Three Kingdoms
Hua Xiong plays a more significant role in the 14th-century historical novel Romance of the Three Kingdoms. He is described as a "stalwart man of fierce mien, lithe and supple as a beast. He had a round head like a leopard and shoulders like an ape's."

In Chapter 5, as warlords from the east of Hangu Pass form a coalition against Dong Zhuo, Hua Xiong stations at Sishui Pass to ward off the oncoming attack. When Lü Bu requests to lead troops to attack the enemy, Hua Xiong steps in and says, "An ox-cleaver to kill a chicken! There is no need for the General to go. I will cut off their heads as easily as I would take a thing out of my pocket!" Dong Zhuo then puts Hua Xiong in charge.

Having single-handedly slain four warriors from the coalition – Zu Mao (祖茂), Pan Feng (潘鳳), Bao Zhong (鮑忠), and Yu She (俞涉) – Hua Xiong seems invincible. Despite mistrust from many warlords of the coalition, most notably their leader Yuan Shao, Guan Yu volunteers to fight Hua Xiong. To convince them to give him the opportunity, he tells them that if he fails to defeat Hua Xiong, the coalition can take his head as punishment. When Cao Cao pours Guan Yu a cup of warm wine, Guan Yu puts it on hold and says he will return very soon victorious. As promised, Guan Yu returns quickly with Hua Xiong's head, whilst Cao Cao who was still holding the cup of wine, realised just how quickly it took Guan Yu to slay the notorious General Hua Xiong. Cao Cao then gives the cup of wine - still warm - to Guan Yu who gulps down the wine victoriously. This is known as "wen jiu zhan Hua Xiong" (溫酒斬華雄), which roughly translates to 'Slaying Hua Xiong while the wine remains warm'.

See also
 Lists of people of the Three Kingdoms

References

Works cited

Further reading
 Chen, Shou (3rd century). Records of the Three Kingdoms (Sanguozhi).
 Fan, Ye (5th century). Book of the Later Han (Houhanshu).
 Luo, Guanzhong (14th century). Romance of the Three Kingdoms (Sanguo Yanyi).
 Pei, Songzhi (5th century). Annotations to Records of the Three Kingdoms (Sanguozhi zhu).

Year of birth unknown
2nd-century births
191 deaths
Dong Zhuo and associates